Kroer Church  (Kroer kirke) is a "long church"   in the Deanery of Søndre Follo at  Ås, in Viken county, Norway.

History
Kroer Church is built in 1925 of wood and can accommodate 120 people. It was designed by Norwegian architect Harald Sund (1876–1940). 

 
There were three previous churches in Kroer before the present one was built. The earlier ones dated from 1340, 1550, and 1852. The 1852 church was destroyed in a fire in July 1923.

References

External links
 Kroer Parish
 Kirkesøk: Kroer Church
 Directorate of Cultural Heritage: Kroer Church

Churches in Viken
Cultural heritage of Norway
20th-century Church of Norway church buildings
Churches completed in 1925
1925 in Norway